Susan N. Houseman (born 1956) is an American economist who is the vice president and director of research at the W. E. Upjohn Institute for Employment Research. She is also a member of the National Bureau of Economic Research Conference on Research on Income and Wealth, chairs the Technical Advisory Committee of the U.S. Bureau of Labor Statistics, and co-directs the Labor Statistics Program at the IZA Institute of Labor Economics.

Education 
Houseman holds a bachelor of arts degree in economics and international relations from the University of Virginia and a Ph.D. in economics from Harvard University (1985).

Career 
Houseman began her career as a professor at the University of Maryland School of Public Policy and a visiting scholar at the Brookings Institution. She left these institutions in 1989 to join the  W. E. Upjohn Institute for Employment Research of Kalamazoo, in large part because this position allowed her more time to raise her four children. Her research focuses on temporary help employment, outsourcing, and the way that these working arrangements affect workers' compensation and official measures of productivity.  Her research has shown that extraordinary growth in the computer industry—not automation in other industries—is responsible for all of the unusual productivity growth in the manufacturing sector, and that declining manufacturing employment in the US is due more to trade than to automation.

During the Covid-19 recession, Houseman was a frequent commentator on layoffs and unemployment insurance programs. She also advocated the use of voluntary workshare programs to maintain relationships between workers and employers. Her research on the success of these programs in European countries was cited by the Biden presidential campaign in their plans to expand the use of such programs in the United States.

Selected works 

 Houseman, Susan N. "Why employers use flexible staffing arrangements: Evidence from an establishment survey." Ilr Review 55, no. 1 (2001): 149-170.
 David, H., and Susan N. Houseman. "Do temporary-help jobs improve labor market outcomes for low-skilled workers? Evidence from" Work First"." American economic journal: applied economics 2, no. 3 (2010): 96-128.
 Houseman, Susan, Christopher Kurz, Paul Lengermann, and Benjamin Mandel. "Offshoring bias in US manufacturing." Journal of Economic Perspectives 25, no. 2 (2011): 111-32.
 Houseman, Susan. "Outsourcing, offshoring and productivity measurement in United States manufacturing." International Labour Review 146, no. 1‐2 (2007): 61-80.
 Abraham, Katharine G., and Susan N. Houseman. Does employment protection inhibit labor market flexibility? Lessons from Germany, France, and Belgium. No. w4390. National Bureau of Economic Research, 1993.

References 

American women economists
20th-century American economists
21st-century American economists
University of Maryland, College Park faculty
Harvard University alumni
Labor economists
University of Virginia alumni
Living people
1956 births
20th-century American women
21st-century American women